Mahir Sağlık (born 18 January 1983) is a Turkish professional footballer who plays as a striker.

Career 

Sağlık signed a three-year deal for VfL Wolfsburg in September 2008. On 1 February 2009, he was loaned out to Karlsruher SC until the end of the season. On 31 August 2009, he was loaned out again to SC Paderborn. In January 2013, he returned to SC Paderborn 07 on a permanent deal. He scored his first goal on his return in a 2–2 away draw against former club FC St. Pauli and his first goal at the Benteler Arena in a 2–0 win against 1860 Munich on the final home game of the season.

Sağlık signed with 3. Liga club SC Verl in July 2021, following a trial.

Career statistics

References

External links
 
 
 
 

1983 births
Living people
Sportspeople from Paderborn
Association football forwards
Turkish footballers
Footballers from North Rhine-Westphalia
Turkey youth international footballers
FC Admira Wacker Mödling players
SC Paderborn 07 players
Rot Weiss Ahlen players
Borussia Dortmund II players
1. FC Saarbrücken players
Wuppertaler SV players
VfL Bochum players
VfL Wolfsburg players
VfL Wolfsburg II players
Karlsruher SC players
Karlsruher SC II players
FC St. Pauli players
Vasas SC players
Eyüpspor footballers
Sakaryaspor footballers
KSV Hessen Kassel players
SC Verl players
Austrian Football Bundesliga players
Bundesliga players
2. Bundesliga players
3. Liga players
Regionalliga players
Nemzeti Bajnokság I players
Turkish expatriate footballers
Expatriate footballers in Austria
Turkish expatriate sportspeople in Austria
Expatriate footballers in Hungary
Turkish expatriate sportspeople in Hungary